Gyalshing District or Geyzing District is a district of the Indian state of Sikkim. Its headquarter is Geyzing, also known as Gyalshing. The district is a favourite with trekkers due to the high elevations. Other important towns include Pelling and Yuksom. Local people also call it as Pallo-Sikkim and Sano-Sikkim commonly.

History
Gyalshing district is the site of the ancient state capital Yuksom. It served as Sikkim's capital beginning in 1642 for almost 50 years until it was shifted to Rabdentse. The district was under the occupation of the Nepalese for 30 years in the eighteenth and nineteenth centuries. After Anglo-Nepalese War (1814–16), the district was returned to Sikkim.

Geography
Attractions include the Khecheopalri Lake, where, according to legend, not a leaf is allowed to fall on the surface of the lake and the Dubdi Monastery, the first monastery of the state.

Assembly constituencies
The district was previously divided into 5 assembly constituencies.
Yoksam-Tashiding (BL)
Yangthang 
Maneybung-Dentam
Gyalshing-Barnyak 
Rinchenpong (BL)

National protected area
Khangchendzonga National Park (Part)

Economy
The economy is mainly agrarian, despite most of the land being unfit for cultivation owing to the precipitous and rocky slopes.

Transport
Roads are in poor condition owing to the frequent landslides.

Demographics
According to the 2011 census Gyalshing district has a population of 136,435, roughly equal to the nation of Grenada. This gives it a ranking of 608th in India (out of a total of 640). Its population growth rate over the decade 2001-2011 was  10.58%. It has a sex ratio of 941 females for every 1000 males, and a literacy rate of 78.69%.

After bifurcation the district had a population of 71,675. Scheduled Castes and Scheduled Tribes made up 3,391 (4.73%) and 31,847 (44.43%) of the population respectively.

The people are mainly of Limbu descent. Other ethnic groups include the Lepcha and Bhutia communities. Nepali is the most widely spoken language in the district.

Religion

Hinduism is followed by majority of the people in the district. Buddhism followed by a considerable population. 

The Kirateshwar Mahadev Temple, a major Hindu pilgrimage centre in Sikkim, is situated in Legship in the district.

Languages

At the time of the 2011 Census of India, 51.85% of the population in the district spoke Nepali, 22.61% Limbu, 8.68% Lepcha, 7.05% Bhotia, 2.69% Sherpa, 1.55% Rai and 1.48% Hindi as their first language.

Flora and fauna

Gyalshing district houses a great diversity of flora and fauna, many of which are used by Indigenous and local communities. Since most of the district is hilly it enjoys a temperate climate. Above 3,800 m (12,000 ft) the slopes are full of rhododendron forests.

It shares the park with North Sikkim district.

Divisions

Administrative divisions
  

Gyalshing district is divided into two sub-divisions:

References

External links

Official district website

 
Districts of Sikkim